The St Kitts & Nevis Patriots are a Caribbean Premier League (CPL) cricket franchise based in Saint Kitts and Nevis, and participated in the competition for the first time in 2015. The team will play its home games at Warner Park, Basseterre, located on Saint Kitts, and, like the league's other franchises, draw the majority of its players from West Indian domestic teams.

The league's first expansion team, the new franchise was announced on 27 January 2015, supported by the Saint Kitts and Nevis government, as well as the local business community. During the 2014 CPL tournament, Warner Park hosted nine matches, played over 10 days in August and accompanied by several carnivals and other entertainments. The venue hosted the final six group-stage matches, and then the finals series, comprising two semi-finals and the final between the Barbados Tridents and the Guyana Amazon Warriors.

The Saint Kitts and Nevis franchise effectively replace the Antigua Hawksbills franchise (based in Antigua and Barbuda), although it is intended that the Hawksbills franchise will be revived at a later date, with the CPL consequently featuring seven teams rather than six. The Hawksbills were primarily removed from the competition in order to make scheduling easier, though their poor results and lack of a private owner also contributing to their removal. Saint Kitts and Nevis nominated four previous Hawksbills players – Justin Athanaze, Carlos Brathwaite, Orlando Peters, and Devon Thomas – as their "retained players" prior to the 2015 CPL Draft. South African Eric Simons, formerly senior coach of the Delhi Daredevils in the Indian Premier League (IPL) was confirmed as the franchise's inaugural coach in early February 2015.

Current squad
 Players with international caps are listed in bold.
As of 4 April 2022

Statistics

CPL overall results 

Note:
 Abandoned matches are counted as NR (no result)
 Win or loss by super over or boundary count are counted as tied.
 Tied+Win - Counted as a win and Tied+Loss - Counted as a loss.
 NR indicates no result.

Administration and support staff

Batting and Bowling statistics

Most runs 

Source: ESPNcricinfo, Last updated: 5 September 2021

Most wickets 

Source: ESPNcricinfo, Last updated: 5 September 2021

Seasons

Caribbean Premier League

The 6ixty

See also
 Leeward Islands cricket team

References

Cricket in Saint Kitts and Nevis
Cricket teams in the West Indies
Caribbean Premier League teams
Cricket clubs established in 2015
2015 establishments in Saint Kitts and Nevis